The 2000 Big South Conference men's basketball tournament took place March 2–4, 2000, at the Asheville Civic Center in Asheville, North Carolina. For the second consecutive year, the tournament was won by the Winthrop Eagles, led by head coach Gregg Marshall.

Format
Six teams participated in the tournament, hosted at the Asheville Civic Center. Teams were seeded by conference winning percentage. As part of their transitional phase, conference members Elon and High Point were ineligible for the tournament.

Bracket

* Asterisk indicates overtime game
Source

All-Tournament Team
Greg Lewis, Winthrop
Tyson Waterman, Winthrop
Robbie Waldrop, Winthrop
Brett Carey, UNC Asheville
Andre Smith, UNC Asheville

References

Tournament
Big South Conference men's basketball tournament
Big South Conference men's basketball tournament
Big South Conference men's basketball tournament